MusicMatch Jukebox was an audio player made by San Diego-based MusicMatch, Inc. It contained features commonly found in jukebox software such as the ability to manage digital audio files and playlists, audio file conversion, an online music store, Internet radio, music CD playback and ripping software and managing media on portable media players.
MusicMatch Jukebox was bundled with the Apple iPod as its music manager until the introduction of iTunes for Windows in 2003. In September 2004, Yahoo! announced the acquisition of MusicMatch Inc. for a reported price of $160 million. Following the acquisition, the application was rebranded Y! Music Musicmatch Jukebox. 
On August 31, 2007, Yahoo! discontinued MusicMatch services in an effort to move users to its own music services.

MusicMatch
MusicMatch is the former company (founded in 1997) that developed the Musicmatch Jukebox software. Jukebox was added to the software name when the dynamic playlist feature-set was added to the software.  Subsequent products included Musicmatch Radio, Musicmatch Music Store, and Musicmatch On Demand. The original Musicmatch name and brand were developed by Creative Multimedia and were part of a series of media-oriented online resources, including Moviematch.

On September 14, 2004, Yahoo! announced that it would acquire Musicmatch. The acquisition was completed on October 19, 2004, for a reported price of US $160 million.

In September 2008, Yahoo! Music Jukebox went out of business.

Yahoo! 
As of Musicmatch 10.1, Yahoo! branding was incorporated. The former logo has been replaced by a pure Yahoo! purple logo, and the Y! Music logo replaces the location of the Musicmatch logo elsewhere in the product. The Music Store now uses Yahoo! IDs for authentication. Version 10.1 of the Jukebox is no longer available on the Musicmatch website; however, older versions can be downloaded. In its place, the website now offers the Yahoo! Music Jukebox. In mid-2007 Yahoo! began migrating Musicmatch users to the Yahoo! Music Jukebox with plans to discontinue the MusicMatch service on August 31, 2007. A group of Musicmatch users disappointed with the changes that Yahoo! made was formed as a result of this migration.

Yahoo has disabled the Super tagging function that automatically analyzes songs and assigns tag elements (Artist, Album, Track Name and Number). However, Musicmatch 10.1 can still be used to modify tags for a single song or groups of songs and then rename files based on those tag elements. The software remains highly functional for tagging and organizing music.

In an attempt to get Musicmatch Jukebox users and owners to upgrade to Yahoo Music Jukebox, Yahoo used the Musicmatch Update software to add a nagware screen to the existing Musicmatch install. This screen was installed for Musicmatch 9 and 10 users whether or not they checked the "Check for upgrades" box in programs setting. When Yahoo modified the Musicmatch installation, it would nag to upgrade by September 2007 every time the program ran. On installs with this nagware activated, this screen continued to appear, even though September 2007 is well past and Yahoo has dropped the entire product line.

Partnerships
Musicmatch Jukebox was provided on most Dell consumer computers as Dell Jukebox by Musicmatch. As such, the branded version contains Dell logos, integration with Dell Digital DJ, and integration with Dell's Media Experience product, and a co-branded music store (Dell Music Store).

Musicmatch Jukebox was also provided to Earthlink customers as Earthlink Jukebox by Musicmatch. It is similar to the Dell product, except that it is still based on the older Musicmatch Jukebox 9.0 product.

Apple iPod and Musicmatch
When Apple released iTunes in January of 2001 for free it destroyed the payware business model of Musicmatch Jukebox for Mac, resulting in the rapid layoff of the Mac development team. 

On July 17, 2002, Apple introduced the first iPod for Windows, which included the Musicmatch Jukebox to manage the user's music library and transfer music to the iPod. With the introduction of iTunes for Windows on October 16, 2003 they stopped bundling the Musicmatch software.

Software
The Jukebox has a skinnable graphical interface and allows users to manage a catalogue of digital music, as well as CD and stream-based audio. It has a fairly advanced AutoDJ but has been noted as having a longer boot-up time than other players. The Plus version includes faster rip and burn times, exportable tables and tech support, as well as a "Super-Tagging" function that fetches for tags and album art and attaches them to the song file, allows you to customize the art and tags for any files in a directory, or rename files based upon the tags already stored in the files. These features, and others, were meant to be incentives to upgrade from the free version, which lacks them. The upgrade is done by entering a serial number which must pass a local validity test.

Musicmatch 7 added the ability to record from "Mixer In" if a full duplex sound card is installed. Musicmatch (versions 9 and earlier) is well equipped to transfer LP records and streaming audio to MP3 as it has the ability to listen for silences of customizable level (percentage of original volume) and duration (in seconds). This allows Musicmatch to split a ripped LP into tracks automatically and to stop recording after playback of a stream was complete. A delayed recording start was also of benefit when recording streams.

Many long-time Musicmatch users never updated to Yahoo Musicmatch preferring to stay with Musicmatch 9 or 10. Starting with Musicmatch 10, several key features began to be removed. While 10 added several features related to listing online radio through Musicmatch services, a bug eliminated the ability to split tracks when recording from Mixer-in. The Yahoo Musicmatch version dropped the much favored 'super-tagging' feature. Registration keys for Musicmatch Jukebox Plus still function. However no new versions of Musicmatch (or Yahoo! Jukebox) are available for download. Yahoo! now offers Rhapsody in partnership with RealNetworks.

When Windows 7 was released, users had come to find that the newer versions of MusicMatch were no longer compatible with this OS release because of an error recognizing one of the critical DLL files.  The simplest workaround is to load MusicMatch 7.5 as the DLL files in the older version are compatible with all versions of Windows 7. Windows 7 Home Premium (64-bit) does support version 9 of Musicmatch.

Old versions of MusicMatch 10 still work with Windows 8 up to 10. Version 9 had problems when it first started and it was replaced very quickly with version 10. With the original MusicMatch Jukebox version 10 you can rip, burn, and play music, although the demo version has a burn limit.

"Mic in track"
Earlier versions of MusicMatch Jukebox would give a default filename of Mic in track (as well as Line in track and Mixer in track) to user recordings. In the late 1990s and early 2000s, Mic in track files began appearing on file-sharing networks such as Napster, usually without the knowledge of their creators. Because of the unique name, voyeurs could easily search for the files and listen to audio of unknowing individuals performing karaoke or joking around with friends. Several websites are devoted to cataloging and featuring their favorite Mic in track files.

See also
Comparison of audio player software
Jukebox
MP3

References

Windows media players
Windows CD ripping software
Online music database clients
Jukebox-style media players
Defunct software companies of the United States
Online music stores of the United States
Discontinued Yahoo! services
Defunct digital music services or companies
Yahoo! acquisitions